"Love Is Blind" is the sixty-second episode and the twenty-seventh episode of the third season (1988–89) of the television series The Twilight Zone. In this episode, a trucker plotting to murder his wife and her lover is confronted by a mysterious stranger who knows everything about him.

Plot
Truck driver Jack Haines enters a bar where he has been informed that his wife Elaine is meeting another man, planning to kill them with his concealed handgun. Elaine has not arrived, so he waits at the bar. A blind singer on stage begins singing about a man who discovers his wife is cheating on him. The bartender tells Jack that he was not scheduled and just dropped by, offering to perform in exchange for board and beer.

The singer sits next to Jack and tells him the song is about Jack himself. He advises Jack that going through with the murder will only make his pain worse. Jack notices Elaine sit down at a table. A man hits on her and she brushes him off. Jack initially mistakes this for the rendezvous, and the singer points out that Jack could have shot the wrong man. He also reveals he knows that Jack himself has engaged in multiple extramarital affairs during his road trips.

The singer tells him how he became blind: he was having a good time with a woman and was shot by her husband. The bullet passed through his head and hit the woman, killing her. The shooter hanged himself and the singer was rendered blind, in the process acquiring the talent to know about people's pain. When his power activates, he knows the right song to sing. Elaine is joined by Jack's best friend, Taylor. Jack approaches their table and pulls out the gun. Elaine steps forward and he shoots her instead of Taylor. He is pursued out of the bar, into the woods, and makes his way to the police. He overhears Taylor tell them that Elaine wanted to surprise Jack for their anniversary. She was meeting with Taylor to choose new wheels for his truck.

Jack awakens in the bar. The singer explains that his songs give a taste of what might happen. Elaine and Taylor leave and Jack notices a truck catalog in the trash. Jack goes to his truck where he finds the singer, who asks for a ride down the road, for he has more songs to sing. Jack points out that it is believed impossible to survive a bullet wound through the head. When the truck pulls away we see that the passenger seat is empty and Jack is actually alone in the truck.

External links
 

1989 American television episodes
The Twilight Zone (1985 TV series season 3) episodes